Alex Ramos (born January 17, 1961) is a former middleweight boxer from the 1980s.  A native of Manhattan, New York, whose parents were from Puerto Rico, Ramos won four Golden Gloves titles in New York City in the late 1970s (1977–1980) and was on the USA Boxing team from 1978–80. Ramos was nicknamed "The Bronx Bomber" after Joe Louis, whose nickname was "The Brown Bomber".

Ramos turned pro after his amateur career was abruptly ended by President Jimmy Carter's decision to boycott the 1980 Summer Olympics in Moscow due to the Russian invasion of Afghanistan. Upon turning pro, Ramos was the first professional boxer who was managed by Shelly Finkel. Alex Ramos later went on to win the International Boxing Federation USBA Middleweight title when he defeated Curtis Parker in 1984.

After Ramos's retirement, he fell victim to alcohol/substance abuse and found himself living on the streets, which ultimately led to Ramos entering rehab. He then went on to form the Retired Boxer's Foundation (a non-profit foundation) with the help of Jacquie Richardson.

Amateur career
Ramos had an amateur record of 143-15 (132 KOs).  Ramos won four New York Golden Gloves Championships.  Ramos won the 1977 147 lb Sub-Novice Championship, defeating Julian Kelly in the finals; the 1978 160 lb Open Championship over Norberto Sabater; the 1979 160 lb Open Championship over Noel Tucker and the 1980 156 lb Open Championship over Ramon Nieto.  Ramos trained at the Jerome Boxing Club in the Bronx, New York, in 1977 and 1978.  In 1979 and 1980 Ramos trained at the Bronxchester Boys Club in the Bronx, New York.

Ramos's amateur career highlights include winning the 1979 National Amateur Athletic Union Championship for the 165 lb division and the 1979 Intercity Golden Gloves in the 156 lb. division.

Ramos originally intended to fly on LOT Polish Airlines Flight 7, where several of his teammates were killed, but stayed to participate in the 1980 National Golden Gloves.

Professional boxing career
Ramos began his professional boxing career on November 8, 1980, by defeating Steve Arvin by a fifth round knockout in Stateline, Nevada.

Ramos won his first five fights by knockout. These bouts included four fights in the eastern United States and one in Texas. On March 28, 1981, in Syracuse, New York, Dan Snyder became the first boxer to go the scheduled distance with Ramos, who beat Snyder by a six-round decision.

On May 23, 1981, Ramos had his first professional fight abroad when he beat Donnie Long by an eight rounds decision in San Remo, Italy. His next fight, on June 21 of the same year, marked his Atlantic City debut, when he defeated Mike Sacchetti, also by an eight rounds decision. Ramos would fight in Atlantic City several times during his career.

Ramos won six more fights, including a victory over Norberto Sabater, before suffering his first loss, being knocked out in round eight by Ted Sanders on August 18, 1982, in Atlantic City. He then fought Tony Cerda to a ten-round draw (tie) on December 22.

After those two setbacks, however, Ramos became a ranked middleweight by virtue of three straight victories, including a ten-round decision over future world light-heavyweight champion J.B. Williamson on May 1 in Atlantic City. Despite losing his next fight, against future world super middleweight champion Murray Sutherland by a ten-round decision, Ramos was by then held along with the highest ranked middleweights of the era, such as Mustafa Hamsho, Wilford Scypion, Juan Roldán, John Mugabi, Curtis Parker and others.

After knocking out Wilbur Henderson in three rounds on February 8, 1984, in Atlantic City, Ramos challenged Parker for his first career title, the regional, United States Boxing Association Middleweight championship. He won the title by beating Parker over twelve rounds by a unanimous decision on April 25 of that year, in Atlantic City.

A world title fight against Marvin Hagler probably loomed ahead for Ramos after his victory over Parker.  Many fans in the United States took interest in Ramos thanks in part to coverage by such magazines as the Ring and KO, and his career was also covered in Puerto Rico by newspapers such as El Nuevo Dia and El Vocero. A ten-round draw against fringe contender John Collins, however, proved to be the first obstacle for that match to take place. The second, and arguably largest, obstacle for Ramos to challenge Hagler for the World Middleweight Championship came when he lost his USBA Middleweight title, on November 24, by a knockout in round nine against James Kinchen (who years later lost to Thomas Hearns over twelve rounds in a WBO world title bout) in Stateline.

In 1984, Ramos relocated to Scottsdale, Arizona.

After losing to Kinchen, Ramos got back on the contender's list by winning four out of his next five bouts, which included victories over J.J. Cotrell and former Thomas Hearns challenger Fred Hutchings, whom he knocked out in five rounds on August 16, 1986, in Stockton, California.

This victory gave him a try for the California state middleweight title, held by future world champion Michael Nunn. The two boxers met on November 21 in Reseda, with Nunn gaining a twelve-round decision.

After winning two of his three next fights, and after Nunn had vacated the belt, Ramos got a second chance to win the California win. This time, he was knocked out in eight rounds by Tim Williams.

After another victory, Ramos got his third chance at the California Middleweight title, being outpointed by Alphonso Long after twelve rounds on February 3, 1988.

Ramos won ten of his next twelve bouts over the next six years, finally earning him a shot for another middleweight title. On November 5, 1994, he fought Jorge Fernando Castro in Argentina for the WBA Middleweight title. He defeated Ramos by a second-round knockout. Ramos is now retired.

Professional boxing record

|-
|align="center" colspan=8|39 Wins (24 knockouts, 15 decisions), 10 Losses (6 knockouts, 4 decisions), 2 Draws 
|-
| align="center" style="border-style: none none solid solid; background: #e3e3e3"|Result
| align="center" style="border-style: none none solid solid; background: #e3e3e3"|Record
| align="center" style="border-style: none none solid solid; background: #e3e3e3"|Opponent
| align="center" style="border-style: none none solid solid; background: #e3e3e3"|Type
| align="center" style="border-style: none none solid solid; background: #e3e3e3"|Round
| align="center" style="border-style: none none solid solid; background: #e3e3e3"|Date
| align="center" style="border-style: none none solid solid; background: #e3e3e3"|Location
| align="center" style="border-style: none none solid solid; background: #e3e3e3"|Notes
|-align=center
|Loss
|
|align=left| Jorge Fernando Castro
|KO
|2
|05/11/1994
|align=left| Gimnasio Municipal, Caleta Olivia, Argentina
|align=left|
|-
|Win
|
|align=left| Anthony Montana
|TD
|5
|06/09/1994
|align=left| Memphis, Tennessee, United States
|align=left|
|-
|Win
|
|align=left| Larry McFadden
|TKO
|2
|27/08/1994
|align=left| Veteran's Coliseum, Cedar Rapids, Iowa, United States
|align=left|
|-
|Win
|
|align=left| Willie Perry
|UD
|8
|15/08/1994
|align=left| Fort Mitchell, Kentucky, United States
|align=left|
|-
|Win
|
|align=left| Steve "Cleveland" Brown
|KO
|2
|18/07/1994
|align=left| Louisville, Kentucky, United States
|align=left|
|-
|Win
|
|align=left| Steve Langley
|UD
|10
|08/06/1994
|align=left| Pico Rivera, California, United States
|align=left|
|-
|Win
|
|align=left| James "Pitch" Black
|KO
|4
|02/05/1994
|align=left| Kansas City, Kansas, United States
|align=left|
|-
|Win
|
|align=left| Sean "Match Maker" Gibbons
|TKO
|5
|30/04/1994
|align=left| Lincoln, Nebraska, United States
|align=left|
|-
|Win
|
|align=left| Reggie Strickland
|PTS
|8
|25/04/1994
|align=left| Des Moines, Iowa, United States
|align=left|
|-
|Win
|
|align=left| Billy Pryor
|TKO
|2
|07/04/1994
|align=left| Council Bluffs, Iowa, United States
|align=left|
|-
|Loss
|
|align=left| Segundo Mercado
|TKO
|4
|09/02/1991
|align=left| Madison Square Garden, New York City, United States
|align=left|
|-
|Win
|
|align=left| Roberto Rosiles
|TKO
|5
|27/11/1990
|align=left| Reseda Country Club, Reseda, California, United States
|align=left|
|-
|Win
|
|align=left| Ali Sanchez
|PTS
|10
|30/10/1990
|align=left| Reseda Country Club, Reseda, California, United States
|align=left|
|-
|Loss
|
|align=left| Al "Bumblebee" Long
|PTS
|12
|03/02/1988
|align=left| Riverside, California, United States
|align=left|
|-
|Win
|
|align=left| Roderick Starks
|UD
|10
|03/12/1987
|align=left| Marriott Hotel, Irvine, California, United States
|align=left|
|-
|Loss
|
|align=left| Tim "Modern Outsider" Williams
|TKO
|8
|29/09/1987
|align=left| Reseda Country Club, Reseda, California, United States
|align=left|
|-
|Loss
|
|align=left| Darnell "Hard" Knox
|TKO
|10
|11/08/1987
|align=left| Bally's Las Vegas, Las Vegas, Nevada, United States
|align=left|
|-
|Win
|
|align=left| Charles "Machine Gun" Carter
|UD
|10
|29/04/1987
|align=left| Sportsman of Stanislaus Club, Modesto, California, United States
|align=left|
|-
|Win
|
|align=left| Ron "Mitch" Daniels
|KO
|2
|31/03/1987
|align=left| Reseda Country Club, Reseda, California, United States
|align=left|
|-
|Loss
|
|align=left| Michael Nunn
|UD
|12
|21/11/1986
|align=left| Reseda Country Club, Reseda, California, United States
|align=left|
|-
|Win
|
|align=left| Fred "Pumper" Hutchings
|KO
|5
|16/08/1986
|align=left| Stockton, California, United States
|align=left|
|-
|Loss
|
|align=left| Charles "Machine Gun" Carter
|PTS
|10
|08/05/1986
|align=left| Oakland, California, United States
|align=left|
|-
|Win
|
|align=left| JJ Cottrell
|KO
|1
|18/12/1985
|align=left| Arco Arena, Sacramento, California, United States
|align=left|
|-
|Win
|
|align=left| Nathan Dryer
|KO
|7
|12/07/1985
|align=left| Phoenix, Arizona, United States
|align=left|
|-
|Win
|
|align=left|Karl Buchanan
|KO
|2
|14/06/1985
|align=left| Phoenix, Arizona, United States
|align=left|
|-
|Loss
|
|align=left| James "The Heat" Kinchen
|KO
|9
|24/11/1984
|align=left| Caesars Tahoe, Stateline, Nevada, United States
|align=left|
|-
|Draw
|
|align=left| John "Jackie" Collins
|PTS
|10
|10/06/1984
|align=left| Depaul University Alumni Hall, Chicago, Illinois, United States
|align=left|
|-
|Win
|
|align=left| Curtis Parker
|PTS
|12
|25/04/1984
|align=left| Harrah's Atlantic City, Atlantic City, New Jersey, United States
|align=left|
|-
|Win
|
|align=left| Wilbur Henderson
|KO
|3
|08/02/1984
|align=left| Harrah's Atlantic City, Atlantic City, New Jersey, United States
|align=left|
|-
|Win
|
|align=left| Ronnie "Jackie" Robinson
|KO
|4
|14/12/1983
|align=left| Ice World, Totowa, New Jersey, United States
|align=left|
|-
|Loss
|
|align=left| Murray Sutherland
|UD
|10
|13/09/1983
|align=left| Playboy Hotel and Casino, Atlantic City, New Jersey, United States
|align=left|
|-
|Win
|
|align=left| James Waire
|TKO
|10
|30/06/1983
|align=left| Atlantic City, New Jersey, United States
|align=left|
|-
|Win
|
|align=left| JB Williamson
|UD
|10
|01/05/1983
|align=left| Atlantic City, New Jersey, United States
|align=left|
|-
|Win
|
|align=left| Mark Frazie
|PTS
|10
|26/03/1983
|align=left| Atlantic City, New Jersey, United States
|align=left|
|-
|Draw
|
|align=left| Tony Cerda
|PTS
|10
|22/12/1982
|align=left| Caesars Tahoe, Stateline, Nevada, United States
|align=left|
|-
|Loss
|
|align=left| Ted Sanders
|KO
|8
|18/08/1982
|align=left| Resorts Casino Hotel, Atlantic City, New Jersey, United States
|align=left|
|-
|Win
|
|align=left| Wayne Caplette
|KO
|4
|16/05/1982
|align=left| Harrah's Atlantic City, Atlantic City, New Jersey, United States
|align=left|
|-
|Win
|
|align=left| Jimmy "Schoolboy" Baker
|KO
|5
|19/04/1982
|align=left| Resorts Casino Hotel, Atlantic City, New Jersey, United States
|align=left|
|-
|Win
|
|align=left| Charlie Hecker
|KO
|8
|17/02/1982
|align=left| Westchester County Center, White Plains, New York, United States
|align=left|
|-
|Win
|
|align=left| Norberto Sabater
|UD
|10
|14/11/1981
|align=left| Sands Atlantic City, Atlantic City, New Jersey, United States
|align=left|
|-
|Win
|
|align=left| Fermin Guzman
|TKO
|6
|03/10/1981
|align=left| Bally's Atlantic City, Atlantic City, New Jersey, United States
|align=left|
|-
|Win
|
|align=left| Rocky Fabrizio
|TKO
|4
|20/08/1981
|align=left| Ice World, Totowa, New Jersey, United States
|align=left|
|-
|Win
|
|align=left| Mike Sacchetti
|PTS
|8
|21/06/1981
|align=left| Playboy Hotel and Casino, Atlantic City, New Jersey, United States
|align=left|
|-
|Win
|
|align=left| Danny Long
|PTS
|8
|23/05/1981
|align=left| Sanremo, Italy
|align=left|
|-
|Win
|
|align=left| "Dollar" Bill Tuttle
|UD
|8
|16/04/1981
|align=left| Ice World, Totowa, New Jersey, United States
|align=left|
|-
|Win
|
|align=left| "Dancin" Dan Snyder
|PTS
|6
|28/03/1981
|align=left| Carrier Dome, Syracuse, New York, United States
|align=left|
|-
|Win
|
|align=left| Marciano Bernardi
|TKO
|2
|08/02/1981
|align=left| Playboy Club, McAfee, New Jersey, United States
|align=left|
|-
|Win
|
|align=left| Jose "Birdie" Pacheco
|KO
|5
|16/01/1981
|align=left| HemisFair Arena, San Antonio, Texas, United States
|align=left|
|-
|Win
|
|align=left| Leo "The Lion" Martinez
|KO
|1
|20/12/1980
|align=left| Kingsbridge Armory, Bronx, New York, United States
|align=left|
|-
|Win
|
|align=left| Johnny "Reb" Davis
|TKO
|4
|25/11/1980
|align=left| Hartford Civic Center, Hartford, Connecticut, United States
|align=left|
|-
|Win
|
|align=left| Steve Arvin
|KO
|5
|08/11/1980
|align=left| Stateline, Nevada, United States
|align=left|
|}

Life after boxing
Ramos began working in the sport of boxing doing other things inside the sport. In 1998, he established the Retired Boxers Foundation whose mission is to assist retired professional boxers in the transition from their glorious days in the ring to a dignified retirement. Among other celebrities who became involved in the organizations are Bo Derek, Mickey Rooney, Lolita Davidovich, Col. Bob Sheridan, Ron Shelton, James Carville and many others.

In February 1999, Alberto Lugo, whom Ramos had known as a neighbor in his youth, was arrested and charged with the assault of three women. When arrested, he told the police he was Alex Ramos. The alleged impostor was found guilty of rape, sodomy and kidnapping. Ramos' private life was severely affected by the Lugo case: since Lugo had told detectives that he was Alex Ramos, many people actually believed Ramos to be a rapist. After Lugo was sentenced and publicly identified as Alberto Lugo, however, Ramos' name was cleared from any rape suspicions.

Ramos relocated to Simi Valley, California, where he lived for a long period before returning to New York to begin the Retired Boxers Foundation. While in Simi Valley, he struggled with drugs and alcohol, but he was able to successfully recover from both addictions.

On August 30, 2008, Ramos was found in a coma by RBF's executive director Jacquie Richardson, who had him immediately rushed to the hospital. Ramos was put on a medically induced coma, and initial prognosis was grim.

Ramos had a professional boxing record of 39 wins, 10 losses and 2 draws, with 24 wins by knockout.

Personal life
Ramos had two sisters named Betty Ramos and Miriam Ramos. His mother passed her name is Socorro Texidor Ramos and father name is Bernardo Ramos. His nieces and nephews from his younger sister Betty Ramos are Beatriz Michelle Velazquez born September 18, 1983, Ramel Ray Anderson March 7, 2000, an all around athlete, Jamel Derrick Black Velazquez born June 19, 2006, and Angel Rayel Velazquez born December 22, 2008. Beatriz is the first college graduate from the family. Betty Ramos died in 2005. His older sister Miriam has two sons George and Christopher Martinez, and a daughter Diamond Martinez. George has a son now named Matthew Martinez. Christopher recently married and is a tattoo artist.

References

External links
 
 Interview in Doghouse Boxing
 Interview by Convicted Artist Magazine
 RBF Retired Boxers Foundation
 The Bronx Bomber Official Website of The Bronx Bomber

1961 births
Living people
Sportspeople from California
Sportspeople from Manhattan
Sportspeople from Scottsdale, Arizona
Boxers from New York City
Winners of the United States Championship for amateur boxers
People from Simi Valley, California
American male boxers
American sportspeople of Puerto Rican descent
Middleweight boxers